Robert MacGregor Mitchell  (11 May 1875 – 25 April 1938) was a Scottish lawyer and judge, Liberal Member of Parliament and University Rector.

Early life 

Mitchell was the son of Mary Rollo (1846–1933) and her husband, Robert Mitchell (1842–1892), a solicitor from Perth.

He was educated at Perth Academy, and at the University of St Andrews, where graduated with an MA in 1895. He then studied law at the University of Edinburgh, graduating in 1895 with an LLB.

Career 
He practised as a solicitor in Perth for some years and was called to the Scottish Bar in 1914. He became a King's Counsel in 1924.

He was elected Liberal MP for Perth at the 1923 general election in a straight fight against the Conservative incumbent Noel Skelton but lost it back in 1924. He did not stand for Parliament again.

In October 1934, he was appointed as Chairman of the Scottish Land Court, succeeding Lord St Vigeans, who had resigned. He took the judicial title Lord Macgregor Mitchell, and held the post until his death in 1938.

He is buried with his parents near the summit of Wellshill Cemetery in north Perth.

Sources

External links 
 

1875 births
1938 deaths
Members of the Parliament of the United Kingdom for Scottish constituencies
UK MPs 1923–1924
Rectors of the University of St Andrews
Scottish Liberal Party MPs
Chairs of the Scottish Land Court
People educated at Perth Academy
Alumni of the University of St Andrews
Alumni of the University of Edinburgh
Scottish solicitors
Members of the Faculty of Advocates
Scottish King's Counsel
20th-century King's Counsel
People from Perth, Scotland